YoUDee (pronounced yoo-dee) is a mascot of the University of Delaware, along with Lil Blue. It is an anthropomorphic "fighting Blue Hen", and its species is the blue hen, as the state bird of Delaware. While YoUDee appears masculine and can have male or female performers, it is "officially androgynous", "neither female or male".

According to the University of Delaware, YoUDee's colors are Blue and Gold because its great-great-great-grandfather was awarded the Gold Medal for Valor during the Battle of Trenton in the American Revolutionary War. The men in the company commanded by Captain Jonathan Caldwell actually carried Blue Hens with them into combat in order to hold cockfights in their spare time. It is said that the men under Capt. Caldwell had bravery in battles that was comparable to their fighting blue hen chickens.

History

Pre-YoUDee 
In 1911, the University of Delaware adopted the Blue Hen as its official mascot.

In the 1930s, the initial physical mascot was a live blue chicken that was tended to by members of the cheerleading team. It is unclear if it was a blue hen, or a chicken with blue feathers, as it is believed there are no true descendants of "fighting blue hens of Revolutionary War times."

Starting in 1950, several costumed "Fightin' Blue Hen" mascots existed. Little is known about them besides the fact that they were "a variety of light and dark blue suits." Few photographs of them can be found. All of the costumes were presumably retired before YoUDee appeared.

One reader of The News Journal in Wilmington requested that the one of the old mascot's costume be displayed in the nearby Bob Carpenter Center. This reader was not alone, as a petition with over 1,000 signatures circulated the state of Delaware, demanding the same. The Athletics Department responded and objected to the petition on the grounds that there was no room for it, and that "it would be inappropriate." Articles from the time indicated that at football games, the old mascots were ridiculed and pelted with items such as "marshmallows" and "batteries" by students on a frequent basis. It is unclear if this was a recurring skit coordinated by the mascot team, or represented student emotions at the time.A successor mascot would take its place. When the University of Delaware President David Roselle was questioned as to why there would be a new mascot, he said "[well], the obvious answer is, the old one wore out."

Hatching 
YoUDee was first seen (or "hatched") at the Delaware-Lehigh football game in Delaware Stadium on September 4, 1993, after being created by Real Characters (an Atlanta-based advertising agency.) Student performers were scouted to wear the costume. After two students applied and performed in tryouts, Robert Boudwin became the first performer of YoUDee. Boudwin worked to build YoUDee's personality and far-reaching image from "Delaware's infamous mascot" to "ass kickin' chickens." With help from David Raymond, the original Phillie Phanatic, the university mascot program has become a gateway to several professional mascot careers.

Chris Bruce, a 2002 graduate that earned YoUDee its initial first-place finish, joined Raymond's mascot-making company, Real Characters. Brandon Williams, a 2003 graduate became the Baltimore Ravens mascot Poe. Other YoUDee alumni went on to perform Philadelphia Eagles' mascot Swoop, and Boudwin went on to perform as Clutch of the Houston Rockets.

Some controversy was aroused in November 1995 when YoUDee "mocked" middies (Midshipmen) at the United States Naval Academy. According to reports some time after the incident, the disturbance was YoUDee mooning Midshipmen, then attempting to carry away the academy's two goat statues. It is speculated that the act was part of some fraternity hazing requirement. Though, not everyone viewed this as mocking, as there were purportedly "many fans, both Navy and Delaware" that enjoyed the mascot's behavior and performance, both before and during the game.

YoUDee was "listed as one of the 16 worst college mascots in the nation" in a Newsweek issue in 1997. By those interviewed at the time, it is believed this designation was given because YoUDee is "unique" or "not tough enough." In contrast, in 2005, YoUDee was chosen to star in a nationwide ESPN News advertisement, and allegedly appeared on Wheel of Fortune, Hardball with Chris Matthews, and Good Day Philadelphia.

Another dispute was with concerns over a skit. In 2006, YoUDee would be carrying a cake, and a staff member would be displaying a sign that read "Happy Birthday Megan!" As the mascot climbed the stands, it would trip and crash into someone with the cake. Later on, the person covered in cake would be wearing a shirt that read "I got caked by [YoUDee.]" Sharon Harris, then Mascot Coordinator at the University of Delaware, in an interview said these skits were staged, and the person receiving the cake would always be a mascot team member.

The program has been directed by Sharon Harris under the university's Office of Public Relations since about 1999 until at least 2012, although it is unclear at what time she stopped and when the university's Athletic department took over the program.

Hello, YoUDee! 
Dana Davis made a children's book titled Hello, YoUDee! which was released and published in 2013 by Mascot Books. It follows YoUDee around the University of Delaware campus before going to the "stadium for the big game." While the licensed book refers to YoUDee with masculine pronouns, YoUDee has been "neither male or female" since 2004.

Awards and recognition 
On August 16, 2006, YoUDee was inducted into the NCAA Mascot Hall of Fame, at a ceremony in Philadelphia's Love Park. This was caused in large part by "YoUDee's fan leadership."

YoUDee has participated and won the Universal Cheerleader's Association (UCA) National Mascot Championship open division several times: 

In 2002, YoUDee won first place in the entire UCA National Mascot Championship. At some point after 2002, the mascot competition would be split into Division I for mascots belonging to universities with Division I football teams, and Open Mascot for all other mascots. The latter division being the one YoUDee would compete in.

YoUDee has also been named to Capital One All-America Mascot Team in 2003, as well as first place in several UCA Mascot summer camps.

✝Due to COVID-19, all mascots competed in one unified division. Whereas previously, YoUDee has been competing in the Open Mascot division for several years.

References

External links
 University of Delaware | YoUDee Profile
 State Bird Entry at "Delaware Facts and Symbols"
 
 

Colonial Athletic Association mascots
Delaware Fightin' Blue Hens